Raadhika Sarathkumar is an Indian actor, producer, entrepreneur 
and politician who predominantly works in Telugu and Tamil films and television. She also appeared in Malayalam, Hindi and Kannada films. She is the founder and Creative Producer of the Radaan Mediaworks India Limited and doing serials in most of the south Indian languages. She made her acting debut in 1978, with the Tamil film Kizhakke Pogum Rail. She made her Telugu film debut with Priya, However Nyayam Kavali was released first.

Films

As actress

Tamil

Telugu

Hindi

Malayalam

Kannada

Dubbing artist

Television

Serials

Shows

Other Works

References

External links 

 

Indian filmographies